Anne Grete Holmsgaard (born 11 August 1948) is a Danish energy expert and politician who served in the Parliament between 1979 and 2011 with an interruption from 1987 to 2001. She was first a member of the Left-Wing Socialist Party and then of the Socialist People’s Party.

Biography

Holmsgaard was born in Odense on 11 August 1948. She graduated from a high school in 1967 and attended Roskilde University, but did not completed her graduate studies. She worked at the Danish State Railways between 1987 and 1995. Next she served as the director of the Technical University of Denmark until 2002. 

She was first elected to the Parliament for the Left-Wing Socialist Party in October 1979 representing Funen County. From September 1986 she began to serve as a deputy for the Socialist People’s Party. Her last parliamentary membership for the party was between 13 November 2007 and 15 September 2011. On 11 July 1988 Holmsgaard was elected in the national congress as a member of the executive committee of the party. She held other posts in the party, including foreign affairs spokesman. As of 2020 she was the chair of the Energy Technology Development and Demonstration Program, a Danish sustainable energy fund.

References

External links

1948 births
Living people
People from Odense
Members of the Folketing 1977–1979
Members of the Folketing 1979–1981
Socialist People's Party (Denmark) politicians
Women members of the Folketing
Members of the Folketing 1981–1984
Members of the Folketing 1984–1987
Members of the Folketing 2001–2005
Members of the Folketing 2005–2007
Members of the Folketing 2007–2011
20th-century Danish women politicians
21st-century Danish women politicians
People associated with renewable energy